Alan Francis is a horseshoes pitcher from Defiance, Ohio. He has won the World Horseshoe Championship 26 times, in 1989, 1993, 1995–1999, 2001, 2003–2010, 2012–2019 and 2021-2022. That is the most anyone has won it (2nd place belongs to Ted Allen who has won 10). He is also the only player to consistently pitch over 90%, and is regarded by many as the greatest horseshoe pitcher ever. The New York Times wrote that he may be "the most dominant athlete in any sport in the country".

He began competing when he was 9, and before he turned 18 he won a record 4 Junior Boys World Championships, the first of which he won at the age of 12 in 1982. He competed in his first world championship in 1978, held in Des Moines. He is the youngest world champion in history. He has the highest ringer percentage in history, and the most consecutive wins in history.

Personal life
He was raised in Blythedale, Missouri, part of a family of full-time farmers and part-time horseshoe pitchers. His father is Larry Francis.
He is married to Amy Brown, a three-time world runner-up, whom he married in 1996. They have a son, Alex Francis, born in 2004.

References

Sportspeople from Ohio
Living people
Year of birth missing (living people)
People from Defiance, Ohio